Therlam is a village in Vizianagaram district of the Indian state of Andhra Pradesh, India.

Demographics
Therlam Mandal has a population of 59,338 in 2001. Males consists of 29,745 and females 29,593 of the population. The average literacy rate is 48%. Male literacy rate is 62% and that of females 34%.

Assembly constituency
Therlam was an Assembly  constituency of the Andhra Pradesh Legislative Assembly, India until 2008.
List of Members of Legislative Assembly:
1978 - Vasireddi Varada Ramarao, Indian National Congress
1983 - Tentu Jaya Prakash, Telugu Desam Party]]
1985 - Tentu Jaya Prakash, Telugu Desam Party
1989 - Tentu Jaya Prakash, Telugu Desam Party
1994 - Tentu Jaya Prakash, Telugu Desam Party
1999 - Vasireddi Varada Ramarao, Indian National Congress
2004 - Tentu Jaya Prakash, Telugu Desam Party

List of Panchayati president details 
 2014 Present panchayati vice president is Mr. Marrapu Shankar Rao from Chinnayyapeta

List of Mandal president details 
 2021 Present MPP is Mrs. Narsupalli Uma lakshmi W/O N. Babji Rao from therlam

References

Villages in Vizianagaram district
Mandal headquarters in Vizianagaram district